Thomas M. Crowley (September 30, 1935 – August 17, 2013) was an American businessman and legislator.

Born in Burlington, Vermont, Crowley served in the Air National Guard for eight years. He then graduated from Saint Michael's College. He owned and operated Crowley Insurance Agency with his family. He also was in the automobile business. He served in the Vermont State Senate from 1967 until 1991 as a Democrat. In 1997, he was appointed assistant judge for Chittenden County, Vermont. He died in Burlington, Vermont.

Notes

1935 births
2013 deaths
Businesspeople from Vermont
Politicians from Burlington, Vermont
Saint Michael's College alumni
Vermont state court judges
Democratic Party Vermont state senators
Vermont National Guard personnel
20th-century American businesspeople
20th-century American judges